The 1923 Estonian Football Championship was the third top-division football league season in Estonia, organized by the Estonian Football Association. Six teams registered for the Championship, played as a knock-out tournament, but KS Võitleja Narva, SK Türi and Tallinna Jalgpalliklubi withdrew on various reasons leaving only three teams competing. ESS Kalev Tallinn won the championship.

Semi-finals

Final

Top goalscorer 
 Ernst Joll (ESS Kalev Tallinn) - 3 goals

References

Estonian Football Championship
1